Stacey Barr (born 12 November 1992) is an Australian rules footballer and basketball player. She has played for the Fremantle Football Club in the AFL Women's competition, and has played in the Women's National Basketball League for the Perth Lynx.

Basketball career
Barr played four seasons of college basketball in the United States between 2011 and 2015 for the University of Idaho. After a stint in the SEABL with the Geelong Supercats, Barr joined the Perth Lynx for the 2015–16 WNBL season. In 2016, she played in the SBL for the Kalamunda Eastern Suns. In 2017, she continued on in the SBL with the Willetton Tigers. She split her 2018 season with a stint with the East Perth Eagles in the SBL before finishing the year with the Frankston Blues in the SEABL. After a season abroad in Luxembourg with Basket Esch, Barr returned to Perth for the 2019 SBL season and helped the Warwick Senators reach the grand final, where they lost 85–56 to the Rockingham Flames despite Barr's team-high 16 points. She was subsequently named the SBL MVP. She continued to play with the Senators in 2020, 2021 and 2022. She won the NBL1 West MVP in 2022 and helped the Senators win the championship.

Football career
Barr was drafted by Fremantle with their ninth selection and sixty-eighth overall in the 2016 AFL Women's draft. She played every match in her debut season to finish with seven matches. She was delisted by Fremantle at the end of the 2018 season.

References

External links 

1992 births
Living people
Fremantle Football Club (AFLW) players
Australian rules footballers from Western Australia
Australian women's basketball players
Perth Lynx players